The Maynard School is an independent and selective day school for girls aged 4–18 in the city of Exeter in Devon. Founded in 1658, the school is the second oldest girls' school in the country, only predated by the Redmaids' High School in Bristol (1634). Its previous mission statement under Ms. Hughes was 'Imagine, Aspire, Achieve' and has changed more recently to #Madeforgirls.

History
It was founded by Sir John Maynard, a trustee of Elize Hele's charity, in 1658. Initially named the Blue maid's Hospital, the school received extensive funding (alongside fellow beneficiary Hele's School) under the express condition that it be spent for "some godly purposes and charitable uses". Robert Vilvayne, a local landowner, further endowed the school by donating premises on Exe Island, while further significant donations were given to the school by Edmund Prideaux and Gilbert Keate. In the 1870s, on the basis of a recommendation from the Endowed Schools Commission, the school split in two. One became the Bishop Blackall Girls' Grammar School (which later merged with the Blue Maid's sister establishment Hele's School), while the second became Exeter High School for Girls. New premises were built in the suburb of St Leonards, and the school recommenced teaching in 1882. In 1912, shortly after its 250th anniversary, the school was renamed by headmistress E L Trenerry as The Maynard School for Girls.

During the blitz of 4 May 1942, three bombs fell on the school. Two hit the tennis courts – one demolished a wall and caused blast damage to windows and the roof, while the second severely damaged the boarding house and kitchen garden. The third bomb exploded in the front of the main building, severely damaging both the school and the houses on the nearby Barnfield Hill. The school was visited by King George VI following the destruction.

The current Headmistress is Mrs Liz Gregory, who took over from Miss Sarah Dunn in September 2022.

Academic environment
Although previously a boarding school, Maynard's now caters exclusively to day students. Many of the original buildings constructed following the split with the Bishop Blackall School in the late nineteenth century remain largely unchanged, even in spite of the damage from the blitz. In addition to these buildings the school has expanded; creating indoor sports facilities, new tennis courts and libraries, a large sixth form center, a new ICT facility (funded by the Wolfson Foundation) and most recently has updated the gym to create a modern Performing arts centre with an extension of a cardiovascular suite attached.

The school offers numerous extra-curricular activities to its students; from team sports competing at the regional and national level, to language clubs and trips abroad. Participation in the annual Ten Tors hiking competition has been a particular staple in the school's history. Maynard teams have had great success over the years, including being the first all-girls' teams back in 2005 and 2012.

Academic standards
The school performs consistently well in UK school league tables, the 2016 results placed the school 16th in the country at GCSE in the Daily Telegraph Independent Schools League Tables.  2017 Department for Education League Tables ranked the school as the best independent school in Devon in key areas. In a recent ISI inspection, the school was rated excellent and its teaching staff were given the highest praise; the assessors noting that academic standards were above average even when compared to other selective schools.

Notable alumni
Alumnae are known as "Old Maynardians" and are members of the Old Maynardian Society.

Gertrude Bacon, aeronautical balloonist and botanist 
Jane Gibson, biochemist and professor at Cornell University
Clare Morrall, novelist shortlisted for the Booker prize
Dame Margaret Elizabeth Turner-Warwick DBE FRACP FACP FRCP FMedSci
Violet Vanbrugh, actress 
Irene Vanbrugh DBE, patron of the Royal Academy of Dramatic Art
Mildred Veitch, businesswoman and horticulturalist
Georgia Toffolo,  Television personality

References

External links
School Website
Profile on the ISC website
Profile at MyDaughter

1658 establishments in England
Girls' schools in Devon
Educational institutions established in the 1650s
Private schools in Devon
Member schools of the Girls' Schools Association
Schools in Exeter